Houghton-le-Side is a small village in the borough of Darlington and the ceremonial county of County Durham, England. It is situated a few miles to the south-west of Newton Aycliffe. The population at the 2011 Census was less than 100. Details are now maintained within the parish of Walworth.

References

External links

Villages in County Durham
Places in the Borough of Darlington
Places in the Tees Valley